Madison LeRoy "Pete" Bonner (September 24, 1894 – December 1, 1972)  was a college football player.

Auburn University
Bonner was a prominent tackle for Mike Donahue's Auburn Tigers of Auburn University from 1916 to 1919. He was a member of an All-time Auburn Tigers football team selected in 1935, as well as coach Donahue's all-time Auburn team. He was nominated though not selected for an Associated Press All-Time Southeast 1869-1919 era team.

1917
Bonner was an All-Southern tackle in 1917.

1919
He led the team to the SIAA championship of 1919 with an 8–1 record.  His brother Thomas Herbert "Herb" Bonner also attended Auburn and played on the football team.

Zelda Sayre sent him a telegram after the defeat of Georgia Tech for the SIAA championship, it read: "Shooting a seven, aren’t we awfully proud of the boys, give them my love—knew we could." She signed it "Zelder Sayre." One account of Bonner's play that day reads, "The Jackets were unable to gain through the Auburn line because of Pete Bonner, giant tackle, who seemed to have a knack of being just where he should have for the best interests of his team."

Death
He died at the age of 78 in 1972.

References

All-Southern college football players
Auburn Tigers football players
American football guards
American football tackles
1894 births
1972 deaths
People from Clay County, Alabama
Players of American football from Alabama